Oladapo Olaitan Olaonipekun, also known as Dagrin (25 October 1984 – 22 April 2010), was a Nigerian rapper from Ogun, Nigeria. A film of his life entitled Ghetto Dreamz was released in April 2011.

Early life
Olaonipekun's home was in Meiran, Alagbado, Lagos.

Career
He released his first studio album Still On The Matter, but the album flopped due to not having enough promotion. In 2009 He released his second studio album called C.E.O. (Chief Executive Omoita). In 2010 he was nominated for the Nigerian Entertainment Awards for Best Album (C.E.O.), Hottest Single "Pon Pon Pon", Best Rap Act and Best Collaboration with vocals. His album C.E.O. (Chief executive Omota English: Chief Executive Thug) won the Hip hop World Award 2010 for best rap album. From it came the singles "Pon Pon Pon", and "Kondo". Dagrin worked with other Nigerian artists such as Y.Q, 9ice, M.I, Iceberg Slim, Omobaba, Terry G, Ms Chief, Owen G, K01, code, MISTAR DOLLAR, TMD entertainment, Omawumi, Chudy K, Bigiano, and Konga. His third studio If I Die was released posthumously One of the song he sang from the album If I Die. was If I Die, it was as if he knew he was going to actually die after the release of that album.

Legacy 

Da Grin was cited as one of the pioneers of dialect rap singers of Yoruba language and Pidgin in Nigeria. Nigerian journalist, Idoko Salihu of  Premium Times   stated that "Da Grin was a rapper who revolutionised the Nigerian rap industry, he infused English with his native dialect".

Ghetto Dreamz
A film of his life Ghetto Dreamz, starring Trybson Dudukoko and Doris Simeon-Ademinokan as his girlfriend has been made and was released in April 2011.

Discography
 Still On The Matter (2006)
 C.E.O (Chief Executive Omoita) (2009)
 If I Die (2011)

Awards and nominations

Won
2010 Hip Hop World Awards – Best Rap Album

Nominated
2010 Hip Hop World Awards – Artiste of the Year

Death 
Olaonipekun had an accident on April 14, 2010 & died 8 days later at the age of 25 on 22 April, 2010 after a vehicle accident in Lagos, Nigeria.

References

External links
Interview about album 
Album review
Biography
Ghetto Dreamz Trailer

Nigerian male rappers
2010 deaths
1987 births
Yoruba musicians
People from Ogun State
Road incident deaths in Nigeria